The Black Sheep of Whitehall (the opening credits read Black Sheep of Whitehall) is a 1942 British black-and-white comedy war film, directed by Will Hay and Basil Dearden, starring Will Hay, John Mills, Basil Sydney and Thora Hird in her screen debut. It was produced by Michael Balcon and Ealing Studios.

Plot
When he is forced to vacate the office of his debt-ridden correspondence college, 'Professor' Will Davis (Will Hay) goes to the Ministry of International Commerce at Whitehall in order to confront his one-and-only student, PR man Bobby Jessop (John Mills). To get Davis off his back, Jessop proposes to get him a job at Whitehall. Jessop then leaves in order to fetch a Professor Davys at the railway station. The professor is a leading economist who has returned from a long stay in South America in order to advise the British government on a trade treaty with the South American nations, which could be crucial to Britain's war effort.

The clueless Davis is mistaken for the expert and gets involved in a series of interviews, giving answers based on gambling, con jobs, double entendres or just plain ignorance. These scenes are very funny and are made more so by the reactions of an increasingly incredulous Joss Ambler as government minister 'Sir John'. Jessop later returns with 'Professor Davys' and the confusion is sorted out, though it has left the BBC interviewers in a state of mental collapse. Jessop then discovers that the man he brought with him is in fact Crabtree (Felix Aylmer), a member of a group of fifth columnists working for Nazi Germany.

Jessop promises Davis a job if he will help him track down the real Professor Davys (Henry Hewitt), who is being held in a safe house by Crabtree's associates. Assuming a number of disguises, Davis and Jessop set off to foil the plot before the treaty is compromised.

Main cast

 Will Hay as Will Davis
 John Mills as Bobby Jessop
 Basil Sydney as Costello
 Henry Hewitt as Professor Davys
 Felix Aylmer as Crabtree
 Owen Reynolds as Harman
 Frank Cellier as Dr Innsbach
 Joss Ambler as Sir John
 Frank Allenby as Onslowe
 Thora Hird as Joyce
 Margaret Halstan as Matron
 Barbara Valerie as Sister Spooner
 Leslie Mitchell as Radio interviewer
 George Woodbridge as Male Nurse
 George Merritt as Stationmaster
 Aubrey Mallalieu as Ticket Collector
 Kenneth Griffith as Butcher's Boy
 Cyril Chamberlain as BBC Producer
 Katie Johnson as Irate Train Passenger
 Ronald Shiner as Porter

Reception
Having been cleared by the British censors on 27 October 1941, the film premiered at the Regal Cinema by Marble Arch in London on 8 January 1942. The reviewer for The Times wrote:"Any story which gives Mr. Will Hay the chance to be himself is good enough, and ... 'The Black Sheep of Whitehall' manages for long stretches at a time to step out of the way of its own complicated plot and leave Mr. Hay to his own devices."

Notes
Hay and Mills had worked before, most notably on Those Were the Days (1934). This was the first film of three where Basil Dearden and Will Hay shared the director credit, the other two being The Goose Steps Out  (1942) and My Learned Friend (1943).

Broadcaster Leslie Mitchell is in the film driven to a nervous breakdown while interviewing Hay's character. Mitchell, best remembered for his Movietone News voiceovers, was a commentator for the BBC Television Service from its first transmissions on 2 November 1936.

The film is generally considered to be Thora Hird's screen debut, although she did make an uncredited appearance in another film (The Big Blockade), released earlier that same year, as a German barmaid.

References

External links
 
 
 

1942 films
1940s war comedy films
British black-and-white films
Films directed by Will Hay
Films directed by Basil Dearden
Films produced by Michael Balcon
Ealing Studios films
British World War II propaganda films
1942 directorial debut films
British war comedy films
Films set in London
1942 comedy films
1940s English-language films